Park was an electoral ward of Trafford covering Trafford Park and part of Stretford.

The ward was abolished in 2004, and most of its area incorporated into the new Gorse Hill Ward.

Its electoral history since 1973 is as follows:

References

External links
Trafford Council

1974 establishments in England
Wards of Trafford